Teague v. Lane, 489 U.S. 288 (1989), was a United States Supreme Court case dealing with the application of newly announced rules of law in habeas corpus proceedings. This case addresses the Federal Court's threshold standard of deciding whether Constitutional claims will be heard. Application of the "Teague test" at the most basic level limits habeas corpus.

Background 
The appeal was from a black defendant who was convicted by an all white jury in Illinois in a state court located in Cook County. The prosecutor had used all 10 of his peremptory challenges to exclude African American jurors but claimed he was trying to get a balance of men and women on the jury.

Opinion of the Court 
The majority held that the actions of the prosecutor did not follow contemporary criminal procedure but that the Batson challenge should not be applied retroactively.

See also
 List of United States Supreme Court cases, volume 489
 List of United States Supreme Court cases
 Lists of United States Supreme Court cases by volume
 List of United States Supreme Court cases by the Rehnquist Court

External links
 

United States Constitution Article One case law
United States Supreme Court cases
United States Supreme Court cases of the Rehnquist Court
United States ex post facto case law
United States habeas corpus case law
1989 in United States case law
Batson challenge case law
Government of Cook County, Illinois
United States jury case law